Debbie Griggs disappeared from her family home in Deal, Kent, on 5 May 1999. She was 34 years old and pregnant at the time of her disappearance. They had three sons.

Investigations and trial
Her husband Andrew Griggs was an initial suspect in the Police's investigation into her disappearance, however the Crown Prosecution Service found in 2003 that the evidence submitted to them offered "no realistic prospect of conviction". A new investigation began in 2018 upon which Andrew was later charged and found guilty of her murder following a trial held at Canterbury Crown Court. Mr Griggs was handed a life sentence with a minimum tariff of 20 years.

Possible motive
Debbie had discovered her husband was grooming a 15 year old girl and wasn't willing to cover up for him. It seems he feared she would get half the family freezer business if she divorced him over the abuse.

Rediscovery of remains
Her remains were discovered in 2022 after a tipoff to police. Her remains were found in the back garden of a house in St Leonards, Dorset where her husband had moved to after the initial investigation.

References

1999 in England
1999 murders in the United Kingdom
1990s in Kent
May 1999 events in the United Kingdom
May 1999 crimes
Murder in Kent
Violence against women in England
Female murder victims
Deal, Kent
Uxoricides